Fatal Attraction is an upcoming American erotic psychological thriller miniseries developed by Alexandra Cunningham and Kevin J. Hynes, based on the 1987 film of the same name written by James Dearden. The series is set to premiere on April 30, 2023, on Paramount+.

Premise
An affair takes a volatile turn when a woman refuses to allow her married lover to put an end to the affair.

Cast

Main
 Lizzy Caplan as Alex Forrest
 Joshua Jackson as Dan Gallagher
 Amanda Peet as Beth Gallagher
 Alyssa Jirrels as Ellen Gallagher
 Toby Huss as Mike Gerard
 Reno Wilson as Det. Earl Booker
 Brian Goodman as Arthur Tomlinson

Recurring
 Wanda De Jesus as Marcella Levya
 Doreen Calderon as Maureen Walker
 Jason Jia as Damien Habalo
 Jessica Harper as Sophie
 John Getz as Warren
 Toks Olagundoye as Conchita Lewis
 David Sullivan as Frank Gallardo
 Isabella Briggs as Stella
 Walter Perez as Jorge Perez
 David Meunier as Richard Macksey
 Dee Wallace as Emma Rauch
 Gary Perez as Rolando Cabral

Episodes

Production
A television series reboot of the film was first announced in February 2021, when Paramount Pictures had announced they would be producing television versions of their films, naming Fatal Attraction, Flashdance, The Italian Job, Love Story and The Parallax View as in development for Paramount+. In November, the series was officially given a series order, and Lizzy Caplan was cast to star as Alex, portrayed by Glenn Close in the film. In January 2022, Joshua Jackson was cast as Dan, portrayed by Michael Douglas in the film. In May, Silver Tree joined as a director and executive producer, with Amanda Peet, Alyssa Jirrels, Toby Huss, Reno Wilson and Brian Goodman joining the cast in June. Wanda De Jesus would be added in a recurring role in July. Doreen Calderon, Jessica Harper, John Getz, Toks Olagundoye, David Sullivan and Isabella Briggs would join the following month. In October, Walter Perez, David Meunier and Dee Wallace were cast in recurring roles.

Filming began in the summer of 2022.

Release
Fatal Attraction is expected to premiere on Paramount+ on April 30, 2023. First images were released in December 2022.

References

External links

2020s American drama television miniseries

Adultery in television
American thriller television series
Borderline personality disorder in fiction
English-language television shows
Paramount+ original programming
Live action television shows based on films
Television series based on adaptations
Television series by Amblin Entertainment
Television series by Paramount Television
Upcoming drama television series
Works about stalking